The Vernita Bridge is a bridge on Washington State Route 24 over the Columbia River between Grant County and Benton County, located approximately  south of Desert Aire and Mattawa, Washington. The bridge is in the Hanford Reach National Monument near the Hanford Site.

Climate
The weather station near the Vernita Bridge is the location of the highest recorded July temperature in the state of Washington. This record was achieved when it reached , in 1928. This is also the site of the hottest April temperature in Washington, in 1934. This is the only place in Washington where a temperature of above  has occurred in April. This happened two times: in 1926 and 1934.

References

External links
 

Bridges over the Columbia River
Bridges in Benton County, Washington
Bridges in Grant County, Washington
Road bridges in Washington (state)
1965 establishments in Washington (state)
Bridges completed in 1965
Steel bridges in the United States
Concrete bridges in the United States
Girder bridges in the United States
Truss bridges in the United States